Iago Fabrício Gonçalves dos Reis (born 2 November 1999), commonly known as Iago, is a Brazilian footballer who plays as a defender for Portuguese club Oliveirense.

Career statistics

Club

Notes

References

1999 births
Living people
Brazilian footballers
Association football defenders
Sociedade Esportiva Palmeiras players
Vitória S.C. players
Vitória S.C. B players
C.F. União players
A.R.C. Oleiros players
S.C. Vila Real players
U.D. Oliveirense players
Liga Portugal 2 players
Campeonato de Portugal (league) players
Brazilian expatriate footballers
Brazilian expatriate sportspeople in Portugal
Expatriate footballers in Portugal